National Tertiary Route 607, or just Route 607 (or ) is a National Road Route of Costa Rica, located in the Puntarenas province.

Description
In Puntarenas province the route covers Parrita canton (Parrita district).

References

Highways in Costa Rica